Gosei may refer to:
 , a Go competition in Japan, a "best of five" contest
 , term describing fifth-generation descendants of emigrants from Japan 
 , five questions for self-reflection in daily life, traditional at Japan's Naval Academy 
 , a character from the TV show Power Rangers Megaforce

See also 
 Goseibai Shikimoku, the legal code of the Kamakura shogunate in Japan, in 1232
 Gosei Sentai Dairanger, a Japanese tokusatsu television series, 1993-94